Harry Guardino (December 23, 1925 – July 17, 1995) was an American actor whose career spanned from the early 1950s to the early 1990s.

Biography
Guardino was born to an Italian family on the Lower East Side of Manhattan and raised in Brooklyn, New York. He joined a Police Athletic League dramatic group while attending high school. After graduation, Guardino joined the Navy, serving in World War II. After the war, he became a merchant seaman. Guardino appeared on stage, in films, and on television. His Broadway theatre credits included A Hatful of Rain, One More River (earning a Tony Award nomination for Best Featured Actor in a Play for his performance), Anyone Can Whistle, The Rose Tattoo, The Seven Descents of Myrtle, and Woman of the Year.

Guardino's other film credits include Houseboat, Pork Chop Hill (about the Korean War), The Five Pennies, King of Kings, Madigan, Lovers and Other Strangers, Dirty Harry and The Enforcer. He was nominated twice for the Golden Globe Award for Best Supporting Actor. He guest starred on John Cassavetes's 1959–1960 series, Johnny Staccato, the story of a pianist/private detective in New York City.

In 1960, Guardino appeared as Johnny Caldwell in the episodes "Perilous Passage", "The O'Mara's Ladies", and "Daughter of the Sioux" in the NBC western series Overland Trail starring William Bendix and Doug McClure.

In 1964, he was cast in a CBS series entitled The Reporter, a drama about a hard-hitting investigative journalist named Danny Taylor. His principal co-star was Gary Merrill as city editor Lou Sheldon. He had co-starred with Merrill the year before in "The Human Factor" episode of The Outer Limits.

In 1971 Guardino starred in the short-lived series Monty Nash. Guardino had a continuing role as Perry Mason's nemesis, Hamilton Burger, in the 1973 television series The New Perry Mason and a recurring role on Angela Lansbury's Murder, She Wrote. He made guest appearances in dozens of television series, including Studio One, Target: The Corruptors!, The Eleventh Hour, Untouchables, Alfred Hitchcock Presents, Kraft Television Theatre, Playhouse 90, Dr. Kildare, The Lloyd Bridges Show, Route 66, Ben Casey, Hawaii Five-O, Night Gallery, Twelve O'Clock High, Love, American Style, The Greatest Show on Earth, Kojak, Wonder Woman 1978 TV series episode 'The Girl from Ilandia', Hunter, The F.B.I., The Streets of San Francisco, Jake and the Fatman, and Cheers. He had the lead role of Det. Lee Gordon in the 1969 made-for-television suspense film The Lonely Profession.

In 1993, a Golden Palm Star on the Palm Springs, California, Walk of Stars was dedicated to him.

Guardino died of lung cancer in Palm Springs, California in 1995.

Filmography

References

External links

1925 births
1995 deaths
20th-century American male actors
American male film actors
American male stage actors
American male television actors
American people of Italian descent
Deaths from lung cancer in California
Male actors from New York City
Military personnel from New York City
People from Greater Los Angeles
United States Merchant Mariners
United States Navy personnel of World War II
United States Navy sailors